Boudabousia tangfeifanii is a Gram-positive and non-spore-forming bacterium from the genus of Boudabousia which has been isolated from a rectal swabs of a vultures (Aegypius monachus).

References

Actinomycetales
Bacteria described in 2018